is an internationally published ten-volume manga series by Natsumi Mukai.  The story focuses on four "+Anima" characters—humans who have metamorphic abilities, and are shunned by society as a result.

Plot 

The plot revolves around four +Anima children: Cooro, Husky, Senri, and Nana. Brought together by their +Anima powers, they search for others like themselves and a place to belong. Along the way, they encounter villains and friends alike, as well as other +Anima. Like many episodic adventure manga, there is not a big overarching story, rather the group travels from town to town, and at each stop over, they get wrapped up in local events. Examples of these adventures include Cooro helping a man fix and use a hang glider (man-lifting kite) to acquire medicine for his village, the group learning the secret of a monstrous +Anima that has been terrorizing another village, and Husky rescuing a man who has fallen in love with the legend of a mermaid. As the series progresses, more is learned about the characters' backstory, and about the setting of +Anima.

The world takes place on a fictional island continent, split between two nations: Astaria and Sailand. Both are mostly desert countries, but Astaria has more varied environments, with some steppes and forest. Between them is the great Moss Mountain range that keeps the two nations separate. On this range live the independent Kim-un-kur tribes. The majority of the series takes place in Astaria, with some later adventures taking place in the Moss Mountains and Sailand.

+Anima 

In the +Anima fantasy world, some humans have an unusual gift that grants them the ability to morph one or more of their body parts, such as their limbs, into an animal's body part. Some are capable of even more radical changes, such as growing wings or full-body transformation. The transformation processes are very fast, and occur at the user's will. When inactive, the morphed areas revert to normal, leaving the person's clothing and body completely untouched. The only visual mark of this ability appears on the body of the person, in the form of a black, tattoo-like marking that determines their +Anima. Occasionally, the user bears some behavioral characteristics of their animal.

+Anima are not treated kindly by "normal" humans. When some are treated poorly enough, they can be taken over by their +Anima. Usually, a full-body transformation results in a berserker or otherwise dangerous creature.

+Anima are not born naturally, and the children of +Anima are human. A human gains their +Anima during times of extreme stress or danger. For example, Husky gained his fish +Anima when he nearly died by drowning. It is unknown if the children of +Anima are more likely to become +Anima themselves, or if they will naturally gain the same powers. Senri's brother and father both had bear-related powers, but this is the only example of a "family" of +Anima, and their similar abilities could be entirely circumstantial.

On the other hand, it has been shown that a +Anima who lives a content and happy life eventually lose their +Anima powers, provided those abilities aren't still necessary for their survival. For example, an injured +Anima was rescued by, and eventually married, to a blacksmith, and the two lived happily for decades, resulting in the eventual loss of her powers.

Characters 

, born August 3 in the 331st year of the Astarian calendar, is a crow +Anima, and can summon black feathered wings from his back and use them to fly. Cooro loves apples. Cooro is naïve, a bit absent-minded, and slow to make decisions. He tends to honor people's decisions, to the point that if people tell him to go away or to leave them alone, he will do exactly that and won't pursue them. However, he is optimistic and always cheerful. In Cooro's hometown, it is said that the souls of the dead are taken by the crows who gather around the body to Heaven. His mother died when she was pregnant and when the crows gathered over the body, he burst out, with a crow +Anima, trying to follow his mother's soul. This means he was born a +Anima, so he, unlike the others, has no idea what is like to be a normal human. Due to his black wings, Cooro sometimes gets mistaken for a black angel, a messenger of death. Cooro has the rare ability to sense +Anima, and these powers are exploited by a man named Fly. Fly has Cooro locate +Anima so he can steal their +Anima and give it to a +Anima girl with white wings called Blanca (Fly claims she is an Angel +Anima, an artificial lifeform found under the city). Cooro had also promised to give Fly his wings when he was older, so that Fly could fly with Blanca. In the end Fly (Cooro's) wings dissolved and him and Blanca fall from the sky and with that Cooro's wings returned and he was his old self again. In the Mukai's original short story, Cooro is much more violent, has wild behavior, and wields a small hatchet. He also has noticeably larger wings, a bird-like tail and the feathers on his arms are smoother.
, real name Myrrha, born March 4 in the 332nd year of the Astarian calendar, is a fish +Anima, whose legs completely transform into a fish tail when jumping into water similar to a merman. He also grows gills, allowing him to breathe underwater and stay submerged indefinitely. When he first meets Cooro, he is in a circus sideshow starring as a mermaid princess (wearing a wig and pearls) Cooro helps him escape and Husky joins him on his journey. Husky has a small fear of water because Lady Dylana, a rival queen and the mother of Keane (who used to tease and bully Husky), attempted to drown him, from which he gained his +Anima. He wields a long staff for a weapon that he took from the Beehive Manor. Husky is revealed to be a wealthy prince who had been teased because of his effeminate appearance. Due to his mother being from the North, children also teased him for his "husky" voice. Also, Husky does not like girls because, as he feels like they are foolish, and because from a young age he was surrounded by the many Queens of Sailand who fight with each other for the King's affection. In Mukai's original short story, the belt around the collar of his cape is slightly smaller and his staff is different. Husky is also more brash and looks older. He may not like Nana in the beginning but starts to care for her as the series progresses.
, born April 30 in 327th year of the Astarian calendar, is a bear +Anima. He is capable of transforming his right arm into a bear-like arm, giving him sharp claws and great strength. He is the strongest melee combatant from the group. He carries a falchion-like sword which he uses to cut wood and bones. He's pretty good at cooking and honey is his favorite food. Senri met Cooro and Husky at a village called Abon where Senri was protecting the Abon plants from a gang; when Cooro and Husky helped get rid of them, Senri joined them. Senri very rarely says anything and usually doesn't speak in complete sentences. Senri carries a book, in which he stores various items and mostly small flowers. It is later revealed that it is the only key to his memories, as he suffered major trauma from when his father died and had severe problems accessing memories. The eye patch that he wears keeps his +Anima under control. Without it he goes berserk, transforming into a full body +Anima and fighting anyone he sees. In Mukai's original short story, Senri has armor plates on his bear arm, and appears to be slightly more talkative.
, born October 12 in the 332nd year of the Astarian calendar is a bat +Anima. Nana is capable of sprouting wings much like Cooro; however, they are bat wings. With them, she is capable of flight. Nana's ears can grow very large, giving her superior hearing that is capable of detecting sound in the ultrasound frequency. In addition, she has uniquely developed vocal cords, making her capable of emitting ultrasound waves from her mouth, which she may use either to navigate in the dark or as a powerful area-effect weapon that temporarily knocks out those who hear it. Her personality is kind, albeit immature, and quite feminine. Nana does not like violence and does not use any weapons. Nana reveals that her drunken father beat her and her mother and, one night, she accidentally stabbed him with her stitching scissors and ran away out of fear. While hiding and later caught from her enraged father, she became a bat +Anima and was able to survive her father's attempt to kill her. It is implied that her mother was killed by her father, possibly in an attempt to protect Nana, due to how Nana had become an orphan that had nowhere to go. Eventually, she joined a group of all-girl orphans in the city of Octopus. She later ran away from them, thinking she was hated because of her powers; in reality, the leader of the all-girl orphans was jealous of her. In Mukai's original short story, Nana appears older and has small notches in her ears in her bat form. She also dresses differently and scolds Cooro often. Also as the series progresses, it is shown that she has feelings of affection toward Husky.

Media

Manga 
The manga was written and illustrated by Natsumi Mukai. manga was published by MediaWorks in  Shōnen manga magazine Dengeki Comic Gao! from 2000 until 2004. MediaWorks published individual chapters in ten tankōbon volumes. The first volume published on 16 December 2000 and last on 26 March 2005. Manga was licensed in United States and Canada by Tokyopop, and in Australia and New Zealand by Madman Entertainment.

Volume list

References

External links 
 English Tokyopop webpage
 
  German Tokyopop webpage 

Dengeki Comic Gao!
Discrimination in fiction
Fantasy anime and manga
Shōnen manga
Tokyopop titles
Orphans in fiction